In music, Op. 9 stands for Opus number 9. Compositions that are assigned this number include:

 Adams – Chamber Symphony
 Adès – Living Toys
 Bartók – Four Dirges
 Beethoven – String Trios, Op. 9
 Chopin – Nocturnes, Op. 9
 Dohnányi – Symphony No. 1
 Kabalevsky – Piano Concerto No. 1
 Rachmaninoff – Trio élégiaque No. 2
 Schumann – Carnaval
 Sor – Introduction and Variations on a Theme by Mozart
 Strauss – Seufzer-Galopp
 Vivaldi – La cetra